Mark Relyea is an American sound editor.

Filmography

Film

Television

Awards and nominations

References

External links
 

Living people
Musicians from Albany, New York
People from Los Angeles
College of Saint Rose alumni
American sound editors
Year of birth missing (living people)